Deng Yingchao (4 February 1904 – 11 July 1992) was the Chairwoman of the Chinese People's Political Consultative Conference from 1983 to 1988, a member of the Chinese Communist Party, and the wife of the first Chinese Premier, Zhou Enlai.

Early life
 
With ancestry in Guangshan County, Henan, she was born Deng Wenshu in Nanning, Guangxi. Growing up in a poverty-stricken family, her father died when she was at a young age and her single mother taught and practiced medicine. Deng studied at Beiyang Women's Normal School. Deng participated as a team leader in the May Fourth Movement, where she met Zhou Enlai in 1919. They married on 8 August 1925 in Guangzhou. Deng joined the Communist Youth League of China (CYL) in 1924 and became a member of the Chinese Communist Party (CCP) in 1925. After the White Terror massacres in 1927, Deng worked underground in Shanghai for five years.

Chinese Civil War
 
Deng was one of the few women to survive the Long March. However, during the Long March she developed pulmonary tuberculosis.

 
After the victory of the Anti-Japanese War, Deng Yingchao, as the only female representative of the Chinese Communist Party, attended the first Political Consultative Conference in Chongqing . In 1946, she was elected as a council member of the International Democratic Women's Federation. In March 1947, she has served as a member of the Rear Working Committee of the CCP Central Committee and acting secretary of the Women's Committee of the CCP Central Committee. In June 1949, she was elected as a member of the Preparatory Committee of the National Committee of the Chinese People's Political Consultative Conference and became a member of the drafting group of the " Common Program ". Later, entrusted by Mao Zedong and Zhou Enlai, she personally went to Shanghai and invited Soong Ching Ling to Beijing to participate in the preparation of the Central People's Government of the People's Republic of China.

People's Republic of China 
 
When the People's Republic of China was founded, Deng Yingchao was elected to the National Women's first to the third vice chairman, honorary chairman of the Fourth; Chinese People's Conseil national children's vice chairman. Since the Eighth National Congress of the Chinese Communist Party, Deng Yingchao has been a member of the Central Committee of the Chinese Communist Party, but has never held a government position. It was not until the death of her husband Zhou Enlai in 1976 that she returned to the political arena of the Communist Party. In December of that year, at the third meeting of the Standing Committee of the Fourth National People's Congress, she was added as the vice chairman of the Standing Committee of the National People's Congress.

In March 1978, after being re-elected as the vice chairman of the Standing Committee of the Fifth National People's Congress, Deng Yingchao served as the second secretary of the newly restored CCP Central Commission for Disciplinary Inspection at the Third Plenary Session of the Eleventh Central Committee of the Chinese Communist Party that year. Co-opted as a member of the Political Bureau of the Central Committee.

Soon thereafter, Deng Yingchao used her early contacts and contacts with the Kuomintang, as well as her network and reputation in the United Front work, to fully take charge of the work of the Central Committee of the Chinese Communist Party in Taiwan, and concurrently served as the leader of the newly established " Leading Group of the Central Committee for Taiwan Work ". In 1982, she served as Honorary Chairwoman of the Chinese People's Association for Friendship with Foreign Countries. From June 1983 to March 1988, she served as Chairwoman of the National Committee of the Chinese People's Political Consultative Conference.

 
In September 1985, Deng Yingchao voluntarily applied for resignation as a member of the Central Committee of the Chinese Communist Party; and in April 1988, after the expiration of the term of the chairman of the National Committee of the Chinese People's Political Consultative Conference, she resigned and recuperated.

In 1987, she served as Honorary Chairwoman of China Population Welfare Foundation. On the same year, when party hard-liners ousted the party's General Secretary, Hu Yaobang, in a campaign against "bourgeois liberalism," it published a 25-year-old speech by Deng. In June 1989, during the Tiananmen Square protests, she supported the leadership's decision to violently suppress the protests.

In October 1990, she resigned as honorary president of the Chinese Nursing Association, due to poor health. In 1991 she served as Honorary Chairwoman of China Society for People's Friendships Studies.

Political positions 
Deng promoted the abolition of foot binding imposed on women.

During the Land Reform Movement, Deng emphasized the need to mobilize peasant women to further the agrarian revolution. In a 1947 policy meeting on land reform, she stated that "women function as great mobilizers when they speak bitterness."

Personal life
Deng and Zhou had no children of their own. However, they adopted several orphans of "revolutionary martyrs", including Li Peng, who later became the Premier of the People's Republic of China.

Death and legacy 

After retiring, Deng Yingchao's body gradually weakened; especially in 1990, she was admitted to the hospital five times because of colds and pneumonia; in August 1991, she began to suffer from renal failure and became unconscious for several times.

At 6:55 am on July 11, 1992, Deng Yingchao died in Beijing Hospital at the age of 88. After cremation, her ashes were scattered in the same place where Zhou Enlai's ashes had been scattered. The official Party evaluation of her is "a great proletarian revolutionary, politician, famous social activist, staunch Marxist, outstanding leader of the party and the country, pioneer of the Chinese women's movement, and highly respected chairman of the Sixth CPPCC"。

There is a memorial hall dedicated to her and her husband in Tianjin.

References

Further reading

External links
Deng Yingchao: a painting and a b/w photo
Exterior of the Memorial Hall

Zhou Enlai family
Women leaders of China
Chinese Communist Party politicians from Guangxi
1904 births
1992 deaths
People's Republic of China politicians from Guangxi
Chairpersons of the National Committee of the Chinese People's Political Consultative Conference
People from Nanning
Wives of national leaders
20th-century Chinese women politicians
Members of the 12th Politburo of the Chinese Communist Party
Members of the 11th Politburo of the Chinese Communist Party
Vice Chairpersons of the National People's Congress
All-China Women's Federation people
Spouses of Chinese politicians